KCLU-FM (88.3 FM) is a non-commercial radio station that is licensed to Thousand Oaks, California and serves Ventura County. The station, owned by California Lutheran University, is a member of NPR and airs local news, weather forecasts, and traffic conditions as well as a wide variety of public radio programming for California's South Coast of California and Central Coast of California, through additional signals listed below.

The station has won more than 200 journalism awards for its local news coverage, including a national Edward R. Murrow Award, and four national Society of Professional Journalists Awards for its news coverage.

KCLU-FM broadcasts in HD Radio.

History
KCLU-FM first signed on October 20, 1994 and originally broadcast a mix of news/talk and jazz programming. By the late 2000s, the station reduced its jazz programming and aired news/talk around the clock.

On June 19, 2008, California Lutheran University (CLU) purchased KIST (1340 AM) in Santa Barbara, California from R & R Radio, LLC for $1.44 million. On October 7, the university converted the station to non-commercial educational status and changed its call letters to KCLU.

In January 2013, CLU purchased KHFR in Santa Maria, California and its translator K209CE in San Luis Obispo from Family Radio for $450,000. The sale closed that May, and KHFR's call sign was changed to KCLM. The station began simulcasting KCLU-FM after repairs were completed.

As an NPR member station, KCLU-FM broadcasts a wide variety of public radio programming. KCLU airs the NPR shows Morning Edition, All Things Considered, Wait Wait...Don't Tell Me!, Here and Now and Fresh Air with Terry Gross. Other programs include The World from Public Radio Exchange (PRX), This American Life, and the BBC World Service. The station previously broadcast Car Talk prior to its cancellation.

Stations
KCLU-FM's network of repeater and translator stations extends its reach across California's Central Coast as far north as San Luis Obispo County.

Those stations feed the following translators:

Awards
KCLU has won more than 70 RTNA Golden Mike Awards, 25 Regional Edward R. Murrow Awards, and 50 APTRA Awards since 2001.

References

External links

CLU
California Lutheran University
Mass media in Thousand Oaks, California
NPR member stations
Radio stations established in 1994
1994 establishments in California
CLU-FM